Frédéric Langrenay (24 September 1899 – 16 March 1985) was a French middle-distance runner. He competed in the men's 3000 metres steeplechase at the 1920 Summer Olympics.

References

1899 births
1985 deaths
Athletes (track and field) at the 1920 Summer Olympics
French male middle-distance runners
French male steeplechase runners
Olympic athletes of France
Place of birth missing